Naan Paadum Paadal is a 1984 Indian Tamil-language film written and directed by R. Sundarrajan. The film stars Sivakumar, Mohan, Ambika and Pandiyan. It was released on 14 April 1984. The film was remade in Telugu as Mangalya Bandham (1985).

Plot 

Gowri is a widowed school teacher who lives with her in-laws. Subramani moves into the same housing complex to stay with his nephew Selvam while he writes his newest novel. He writes under the name CRS and happens to be Gowri's favourite author though she is unaware of his identity. Due to some general misunderstandings, she is initially suspicious of Subramani. On the other hand, he finds Gowri to be intriguing and learns about her past. She was a singer who had fallen in love with a doctor, Anand. With both families' approval, they marry but Anand dies in an accident three days after the wedding. Heartbroken, she gives up singing and has found solace with Anand's family, reading CRS' novels and in teaching children. Gowri soon learns that Subramani is CRS and melts considerably towards him. She sees him as a friend and is often protective of him. Her family notice this change in behaviour and begin to consider the possibility of her marrying Subramani. He is also interested in marrying her but is unsure of her decision. Ultimately, Gowri must decide on which path to continue her life.

Cast 
 Sivakumar as C. R. Subramaniam
 Mohan as Anand
 Ambika as Shyamala Gowri
 Pandiyan as Selvam
 Ilavarasi as Sivagami
 Sarath Babu in a Special appearance
 Suresh in a Special appearance
 Shankar–Ganesh in a Special appearance
 Nalini in a Special appearance
 Poornam Viswanathan as Rangarajan
 V. Gopalakrishnan
 Kamala Kamesh as Maragatham
 Goundamani
 Senthil

Production 
Sivakumar worked as Ambika's makeup artist during the filming of the climax.

Soundtrack 
The music was composed by Ilaiyaraaja. The song "Paadava Un Paadalai" uses the conga, a percussion commonly used in Afro-Cuban genres. The song "Paadum Vanambadi" is set in the raga known as Patdeep, while "Devan Kovil" is set in Yamunakalyani.

Reception 
Kalki wrote .

References

Bibliography

External links 
 

1980s Tamil-language films
1984 films
Films directed by R. Sundarrajan
Films scored by Ilaiyaraaja
Tamil films remade in other languages